Aleksandr Alipov (born 25 May 1948) is a Soviet former sports shooter. He competed at the 1968, 1972 and the 1976 Summer Olympics.

References

1948 births
Living people
Soviet male sport shooters
Olympic shooters of the Soviet Union
Shooters at the 1968 Summer Olympics
Shooters at the 1972 Summer Olympics
Shooters at the 1976 Summer Olympics
Sport shooters from Dalian